
Gmina Świątki is a rural gmina (administrative district) in Olsztyn County, Warmian-Masurian Voivodeship, in northern Poland.

Villages
Gmina Świątki contains the villages and settlements of Brzeźno, Brzydowo, Dąbrówka, Drzazgi, Garzewo, Gołogóra, Jankowo, Kalisty, Kiewry, Kłobia, Klony, Komalwy, Konradowo, Kwiecewo, Łumpia, Różynka, Skolity, Świątki, Włodowo, Worławki and Żardeniki.

Neighbouring gminas
Gmina Świątki is bordered by the gminas of Dobre Miasto, Dywity, Jonkowo, Lubomino, Łukta, Miłakowo and Morąg.

References
Polish official population figures 2006

Swiatki
Olsztyn County